Tomás Javier Bartoméus Viveros (born 27 October 1982) is a Paraguayan international footballer who plays for Guaireña, as a defender.

Career
Bartomeus has played for Club Universal, Rubio Ñu and Guaraní.

He made his international debut for Paraguay in 2010.

References

1982 births
Living people
Paraguayan footballers
Paraguay international footballers
Association football defenders
Club Rubio Ñu footballers
Club Guaraní players
General Díaz footballers
Paraguayan Primera División players